Mihály Dresch (born 1955) is a Hungarian saxophone player. He plays a combination of American free jazz and traditional Hungarian folk music.

Dresch was studying to become an engineer when he turned to jazz. He was a member of the Károly Binder Quartet. Since 1998 he has performed in a quartet with István Baló (drums), Ferenc Kovács (violin), Miklós Lukács (dulcimer), Mátyás Szandai (double bass) has existed since 1998. 

Dresch has worked with John Tchicai, Archie Shepp, Roscoe Mitchell, Chico Freeman, David Murray, Hamid Drake, and Dewey Redman. The project with Archie Shepp led to the Hungarian Bebop recording of 2002, on which Shepp plays Dresch's compositions. Dresch has performed at jazz festivals worldwide, including the London Jazz Festival.

Dresch is a member of György Szabados's band, the MAKUZ Ensemble. Szabados is part of the free music movement in Hungary.

Discography

As leader or co-leader
 Cool Sky (2001)
 Quiet as It Is (Budapest Music Center Records, 2002)
 Egyenes Zene (Straight Music) (BMC, 2004)
 Argyelus (BMC, 2007)
 Gondellied in the Sahara with Miklos Lukacs, Michael Schiefel, Matyas Szandai (BMC, 2010)
 Sharing the Shed with Hamid Drake, Lafayette Gilchrist, Matyas Szandai (BMC, 2010)
 Labirintus with Miklos Lukacs (Fono, 2013)
 Zea with Chris Potter (BMC, 2017)

1985  Sóhajkeserű (Bem rakpart, Budapest, 1985. május 3.)  Hungaroton  Jazz Studium No. 3 (MC)
1985  Kvartet Drech - Peti Jubilarni Internacionalni Susret Dzez Muzicara "Naissus Jazz '85"  Magánkiadás
1987  Hazafelé  Magánkiadás  Jazz Studium No. 6. (MC)
1989  Sóhajkeserű (10. Kölni Jazzhaus Fesztivál, 1988. április 2.)  Hungaroton
1990  Gondolatok a régiekről  Adyton
1993  Dresch Dudás Mihály Quartet: Zeng a lélek  Adyton
1995  Dresch Dudás Mihály Quartett: Folyondár  Adyton
1996  Túl a vizen  (Fonó)
1997  Dresch Dudás Mihály: Hűs-ég  (Fonó)
1998  Dresch Dudás Mihály Quartet: Révészem, révészem...  (Fonó)
2000  Riding the Wind (Mozdulatlan Utazás)  (November Music)
2002  Hungarian Bebop with Archie Shepp  (BMC)
2006  Live Reed (Élő nád) (X-Production)
2009  Ritka madár (X-Production)

References

Dresch, Mihaly
Dresch, Mihaly
Dresch, Mihaly